Liu Dang (born 17 August 1989) is a Chinese rower. He competed in the 2020 Summer Olympics.

References

1989 births
Living people
Rowers at the 2020 Summer Olympics
Chinese male rowers
Olympic rowers of China
Asian Games medalists in rowing
Rowers at the 2014 Asian Games
Asian Games gold medalists for China
Medalists at the 2014 Asian Games
20th-century Chinese people
21st-century Chinese people